Dyschirius neresheimeri is a species of ground beetle in the subfamily Scaritinae. It was described by Wagner in 1915.

References

neresheimeri
Beetles described in 1915